Anne Dalton (born 22 May 1988; legally spelled Ann Dalton) is a camogie player and student. She is an All-Ireland winning medalist 2016, winner of five camogie All Star awards in 2009, 2010, 2014, 2016 and 2017. She played in the 2009 All Ireland camogie final.

Career
An Ashbourne Cup medal-winner with Waterford IT in 2009, 2010, and 2011  she has won All- Ireland Minor and National League titles with Kilkenny. Described as a "stylish captain" in the programme notes for the 2009 All Ireland final she has collected three All-Irelands in succession 2004, 2005, and 2006, four Leinsters and six county crowns with her club St. Lachtain's, and has provincial titles at inter-county level in Under-14, Under-16 (three) and Under-18 (four). Her senior debut was in 2007.

Media
Dalton was the subject of a 2023 Laochra Gael episode.

References

External links 
 Official Camogie Website
 Kilkenny Camogie Website
 All-Ireland Senior Camogie Championship: Roll of Honour
 Report of All Ireland final in Irish Times Independent and Examiner

1988 births
Living people
Kilkenny camogie players
Lesbian sportswomen
Irish LGBT sportspeople
LGBT Gaelic footballers
UCD camogie players
Waterford IT camogie players